The 2011 Košice Open was a professional tennis tournament played on outdoor red clay courts. It was part of the 2011 ATP Challenger Tour. It took place in Košice, Slovakia between 6 and 12 June 2011.

ATP entrants

Seeds

 Rankings are as of May 23, 2011.

Other entrants
The following players received wildcards into the singles main draw:
  Marko Daniš
  Dominik Hrbatý
  Miloslav Mečíř Jr.
  Martin Přikryl

The following players received entry into the singles main draw as a special exemption:
  João Sousa
  Jan-Lennard Struff

The following players received entry from the qualifying draw:
  Andrea Arnaboldi
  Leonardo Kirche
  Javier Martí
  Wayne Odesnik

Champions

Singles

 Simon Greul def.  Victor Crivoi, 6–2, 6–1

Doubles

 Simon Greul /  Bastian Knittel def.  Facundo Bagnis /  Eduardo Schwank, 2–6, 6–3, [11–9]

References
Official website
ITF search 

Kosice Open
Kos
Košice Open